Agatha Jassem is a Canadian clinical microbiologist and the program head of the Virology Lab at the British Columbia Centre for Disease Control Public Health Laboratory, and a clinical assistant professor in the Department of Pathology & Laboratory Medicine at the University of British Columbia in Vancouver, British Columbia, Canada.

Jassem obtained her PhD at the University of British Columbia, followed by a fellowship in Clinical Microbiology at the National Institutes of Health. Her research focuses the detection of healthcare-and community-associated infections, emerging pathogens, and drug resistance determinants.

During the COVID-19 pandemic response, Jassem led research efforts on COVID-19 breakthrough infections from vaccinated individuals, SARS-CoV-2 population level seroprevalence, antibody response  as well as collaborating on research on securing reagents for COVID-19 during world-wide shortages, and the role of ACEII.

References

Canadian microbiologists
Academic staff of the University of British Columbia
COVID-19 drug development
Living people
Year of birth missing (living people)
Place of birth missing (living people)
Canadian women biologists
Women microbiologists
University of British Columbia alumni
Canadian medical researchers
Women medical researchers
21st-century Canadian biologists
21st-century Canadian women scientists